Mami Shimamoto (born 24 September 1987 in Wakayama, Japan) is a Japanese weightlifter. She competed for Japan at the 2012 Summer Olympics. Shimamoto was ninth-placed in the event.

References

Weightlifters at the 2012 Summer Olympics
Olympic weightlifters of Japan
1987 births
Living people
Japanese female weightlifters
People from Wakayama (city)
Weightlifters at the 2014 Asian Games
Asian Games competitors for Japan
20th-century Japanese women
21st-century Japanese women